Sexton Blake is a fictional British detective created in 1893.

Sexton Blake may also refer to:
Sexton Blake (band), American rock band
Sexton Blake (1928 serial), 1928 silent film serial
Sexton Blake (TV series), 1967–71 TV series

Sexton Blake